Stenoporpia polygrammaria, known generally as the faded gray or faded gray geometer, is a species of geometrid moth in the family Geometridae. It is found in North America.

The MONA or Hodges number for Stenoporpia polygrammaria is 6459.

References

Further reading

 

Boarmiini
Articles created by Qbugbot
Moths described in 1876